Delfim José Fernandes Rola Teixeira (born 5 February 1977), known simply as Delfim, is a Portuguese former footballer who played as a defensive midfielder.

In a career marred by injury problems, he amassed Primeira Liga totals of 133 games and nine goals over as many seasons, in representation of five clubs. The owner of a powerful shot, he also competed professionally in France and Switzerland.

Club career
Delfim was born in Amarante. After emerging he was 20 years old in the Primeira Liga with Boavista F.C. he signed with Sporting CP, being an essential midfield element alongside Aldo Duscher in the latter club's 1999–2000 league conquest, after an 18-year drought.

In 2001, Delfim moved to Olympique de Marseille in France, but also began an excruciating battle with injuries, appearing very rarely with the Ligue 1 side and almost retiring from football. In January 2002 he was reunited with former Sporting teammate Dimas and, after an unassuming stint with BSC Young Boys, eventually returned to Portugal.

Delfim was able to revive his career in the 2007–08 season, being very important as Associação Naval 1º de Maio retained its top-division status. For the following campaign he joined top level newcomer C.D. Trofense, retiring at the age of 32 after his team suffered relegation.

International career
Delfim earned his only full cap for Portugal on 15 November 2000, playing the entire 2–1 friendly win over Israel in Braga.

Honours
Marseille
UEFA Intertoto Cup: 2005

References

External links

1977 births
Living people
People from Amarante, Portugal
Portuguese footballers
Association football midfielders
Primeira Liga players
Liga Portugal 2 players
Boavista F.C. players
C.D. Aves players
Sporting CP footballers
Moreirense F.C. players
Associação Naval 1º de Maio players
C.D. Trofense players
Ligue 1 players
Olympique de Marseille players
Swiss Super League players
BSC Young Boys players
Portugal youth international footballers
Portugal under-21 international footballers
Portugal international footballers
Portuguese expatriate footballers
Expatriate footballers in France
Expatriate footballers in Switzerland
Portuguese expatriate sportspeople in France
Portuguese expatriate sportspeople in Switzerland
Sportspeople from Porto District